Hugh Raffles is a British-American anthropologist whose work explores relationships among people, animals, and things. He is Professor of Anthropology at The New School in New York. His writing has appeared in academic and popular venues, including Granta, Public Culture, Natural History, Orion, American Ethnologist, The New York Times, and The Best American Essays.

Life
Raffles grew up in London, England, and moved to New York in the early 1990s. He lives in New York City.

Awards and criticism
Raffles was the recipient of the 2003 Victor Turner Prize for Ethnographic Writing of the Society for Humanistic Anthropology and of a Choice Outstanding Academic Title Award for In Amazonia: A Natural History.

In 2009, Raffles was awarded a Whiting Award. In 2010, Insectopedia was the winner of the 2011 Orion Book Award and received a Special Award from the Society for Humanistic Anthropology. In 2012, the book won the Ludwik Fleck Prize of the Society for Social Studies of Science and was shortlisted for the De Groene Waterman Prijs, Antwerp. The book was selected by The New York Times as a Notable Book of 2010.

Writing in the New York Times Book Review, Philip Hoare described Insectopedia as "impossible to categorize, wildly allusive and always stimulating."

Selected writing

Articles 
 "Mother Nature's Melting Pot," The New York Times, Op-Ed, April 2, 2011.
 "Sweet Honey on the Block," The New York Times, Op-Ed, July 7, 2010.
 "A Conjoined Fate," Orion (2010).
 "Cricket Fighting," Granta 98: The Deep End (Summer 2007).
 Reprinted in Adam Gopnik ed., The Best American Essays (2008).
 "Jews, Lice, and History," Public Culture (2007).

Books 
 In Amazonia: A Natural History, 2002, Princeton University Press, .
 Insectopedia, 2011, Pantheon Books, .
 Insect Theatre, 2013, Black Dog Books, photographs by Tim Edgar, .
 The Book of Unconformities: Speculations on Lost Time, 2020, Pantheon Books, .

References

External links
"The Language of the Bees: An Interview with Hugh Raffles," Cabinet, Issue 25, Spring 2007.
Interview with Hugh Raffles on Big Think
New Yorker blog interview with Hugh Raffles
"Are reactions to insects culturally based?" Universal Forum of Cultures 2010 
New School faculty page - Hugh Raffles
Profile at The Whiting Foundation

Living people
British anthropologists
The New School faculty
British Jews
Year of birth missing (living people)